The men's 30 kilometres points race competition at the 2010 Asian Games was held on 16 and 17 November at the Guangzhou Velodrome.

Schedule
All times are China Standard Time (UTC+08:00)

Results
Legend
DNF — Did not finish

Qualifying

Heat 1

Heat 2

Final

References

External links 
Results

Track Men points race